University of Medical Science(s) is a title used by many educational institutions:

China 
 Bethune University of Medical Sciences, merged in 2000 with Jilin University
 Capital University of Medical Sciences, Beijing
 Chongqing University of Medical Sciences, now called Chongqing Medical University
 Sun Yat-sen University of Medical Sciences, 1886-1925

Iran 
 Ahvaz Jundishapur University of Medical Sciences
 Arak University of Medical Sciences
 Ardabil University of Medical Sciences
 Babol University of Medical Sciences
 Baqiyatallah University of Medical Sciences
 Birjand University of Medical Sciences
 Bushehr University of Medical Sciences
 Fatemiye University of Medical Sciences, Qom
 Gilan University of Medical Sciences
 Hamedan University of Medical Sciences
 Ilam University of Medical Sciences
 Iran University of Medical Sciences
 Isfahan University of Medical Sciences
 Kashan University of Medical Sciences
 Kerman University of Medical Sciences
 Kermanshah University of Medical Sciences
 Mashhad University of Medical Sciences
 Mazandaran University of Medical Sciences
 Qazvin University of Medical Sciences
 Qom University of Medical Sciences
 Rafsanjan University of Medical Sciences
 Shahid Beheshti University of Medical Sciences, formerly the National University of Iran
 Shahid Sadoughi University of Medical Sciences and Health Services
 Shahrekord University of Medical Sciences
 Shiraz University of Medical Sciences
 Tabriz University of Medical Sciences, split in 1985 from the University of Tabriz
 Tehran University of Medical Sciences
 Torbat Heydarieh University of Medical Sciences
 Urmia University of Medical Sciences

Japan 
 Gifu University of Medical Science
 Morinomiya University of Medical Sciences
 Shiga University of Medical Science
 Suzuka University of Medical Science

Other 
 The University of Medical Sciences of Mahidol University, Thailand
 Semmelweis University of Medical Sciences, Hungary
 University of Medical Sciences, Ondo, Nigeria
 Poznan University of Medical Sciences, Poland
 University of Medical Sciences, Cienfuegos, Cuba
 Kerala University of Health Sciences
 National University of Medical Sciences, Pakistan

It may also refer to:

 Allianze University College of Medical Sciences, Malaysia
 Kathmandu University School of Medical Sciences, Nepal
 Liaquat University of Medical and Health Sciences, Pakistan
 Nova Southeastern University College of Medical Sciences, Florida, USA
 University College of Medical Sciences, Delhi, India
 University of Arkansas for Medical Sciences, USA
 University of Medical Sciences and Technology, Sudan
 University of Medical Sciences, Turkey